Ahekõnnu is a village in Kehtna Parish, Rapla County in northwestern Estonia. It lies to the northeast of Järvakandi town.

References

 

Villages in Rapla County